Juan Pablo Cárdenas Squella (born 1 December 1949) is a Chilean journalist and academic who has founded and directed multiple periodicals. He has won numerous awards for his work defending freedom of the press.

He studied journalism at Pontifical Catholic University of Chile; his thesis was titled: "The Press and the Peasant Reality." While he was studying there, he began working for the university's magazine, Debate Universitario, which he would later direct; he left that position in 1973. In 1977, he founded the weekly magazine , which reported on the corruption and human rights abuses of Augusto Pinochet's government. As a result of his work for Análisis, Cárdenas faced physical and legal harassment. He was detained seven times and, in 1987, sentenced to eighteen months of nighttime prison, during which he spent nights imprisoned and continued working during the day. His nightly commute to prison garnered international attention, and he was accompanied by crowds that included colleagues and the media. One night, American playwright Arthur Miller accompanied him. In November 1989, his house was partially burned down by unknown attackers. He continued to direct Análisis until 1991, when it closed due to declining circulation following the restoration of freedom of the press in 1990 by the government of Patricio Aylwin.

In 1992, he founded the magazine Los Tiempos, which he directed until 1993. In 1994, he became press attaché for the Chilean embassy in Mexico, a position he held until 1999 or February 2000. In September 2000, he became director of the electronic newspaper Primera Línea, managed by La Nación, on the condition that he would be able to do "critical and independent journalism"; La Nación was majority-owned by the government of Chile. He published several articles critical of the government, and according to Cárdenas, he had been director "barely fifteen days" before the Secretary General of Government began pressuring him to resign; on 10 January 2001, he was fired at the government's instigation.

Cárdenas taught at Pontifical Catholic University of Chile from 1972 to 1973, at Catholic University of the North from 1974 to 1975, and at ARCIS University in 1990. Since 1991, he has taught at the School of Journalism at the University of Chile, where he belongs to the Academic Senate. During this time, he also taught briefly at the University of Viña del Mar (1993), Pontifical Catholic University of Valparaíso (2002–2004), and University of the Republic (2005). He is married with six children.

In 1986, Cárdenas won the Vladimir Herzog Award. In 1987, he won the Golden Pen of Freedom Award for his work for Análisis. In 2000, he was named one of fifty original World Press Freedom Heroes. In 2005, he received Chile's National Prize for Journalism.

References

1949 births
Academic staff of the Catholic University of the North
Chilean journalists
Living people
Male journalists
Pontifical Catholic University of Chile alumni
Academic staff of the Pontifical Catholic University of Chile
Academic staff of the Pontifical Catholic University of Valparaíso
Academic staff of the University of Chile